Giovanni Pesaro (September 1, 1589 – September 30, 1659) was the 103rd Doge of Venice, reigning from his election on April 8, 1658 until his death. The Cretan War (1645–1669) was ongoing for the entirety of his brief reign.

Background, 1589–1658

Giovanni Pesaro was the son of Elena Soranzo and Vettor Pesaro, a rich man. He rose to prominence quickly, being repeatedly elected as ducal councillor, as a member of the Senate of Venice, and then serving as the Republic of Venice's ambassador to the Vatican, prior to serving as Procurator of St Mark's.

In spite of all of these honours, his reputation was far from spotless. In 1642, he abandoned the garrison of Pontelagoscuro (a frazione of Ferrara), which he was commanding, in the face of the enemy. In the years following this incident, he was implicated of embezzlement and abuse of office. As rector, he appropriated land owned by a citizen for himself.  Following the death of his wife Lucia Barbarigo, Pesaro married his housekeeper, a low born woman whose brother was a criminal banished from the republic.

In spite of these shortcomings, Pesaro managed to work his way into the mainstream of Venetian politics.  With the war against the Ottoman Empire at a low point, and many Venetian nobles considering giving up Crete, Pesaro gave an impassioned speech in the Maggior Consiglio (Grand Council) in favour of continuing the war, in the course of which he pledged 6000 ducats of his own money.  This action inspired the other nobles to continue the war.  His militant attitude won him great favour, and, following the death of Doge Bertuccio Valiero on March 29, 1658, Pesaro was the consensus candidate for new Doge of Venice.

Reign as Doge, 1658–1659

On April 8, 1658, Pesaro was elected as Doge on the first ballot, not least because he was considerably younger than his opponents, and it was hoped that he would have a longer reign than had his predecessors, a wish regrettably unfulfilled.  Pesaro was hated by the people of Venice, and fell ill soon after his election as Doge.

Pesaro faced a difficult situation on becoming Doge.  The war had displaced Venice's commerce, and Venice was heavily overtaxed to pay for the war.

Pesaro died on September 30, 1659, and was buried with great pomp.

References
An initial version of this article was based on the corresponding article on French Wikipedia.

1589 births
1659 deaths
Ambassadors of the Republic of Venice to the Holy See
Republic of Venice people of the Ottoman–Venetian Wars
17th-century Italian nobility
17th-century Doges of Venice
Procurators of Saint Mark
Giovanni
Burials at Santa Maria Gloriosa dei Frari